Hispano or Hispanic refers to something or someone from Spain or a Spanish-speaking country.

Hispano or Hispanos may also refer to:

 Hispanos, descendants of Spanish settlers in the Southwestern United States
 Hispanos of New Mexico
 Hispano FC, a Honduran football team
Los Hispanos (Colombian band) 
Los Hispanos (quartet), a Puerto Rican vocal quartet
 Tata Hispano, a Spanish manufacturer of bus and coach bodies
 Hispano-Suiza, a Spanish automotive-engineering company and aviation component manufacturer

See also
 
 Hispanic (disambiguation)